Ross Township, Indiana may refer to one of the following places:

 Ross Township, Clinton County, Indiana
 Ross Township, Lake County, Indiana

See also 

Ross Township (disambiguation)

Indiana township disambiguation pages